The Complete U2 is a digital box set by Irish rock band U2. It was released on 23 November 2004 by Apple Computer on the iTunes Store. It is the first major release of a purely digital online set by any artist. It contained the complete set of U2 albums, singles, live, rare and previously unreleased material from 1978 to 2004, with a total of 446 songs. This was accompanied by a PDF containing album art, track listings, and band commentary.

In the US it originally retailed for $149.99, but a $50 coupon was included with the U2 Special Edition iPods from the fourth-generation iPod. The video-capable U2 iPods included a code for a 33-minute video of live band performances and interviews. As of 20 December 2007, the set is no longer available for sale.

Disc list

Digital box set-exclusive albums
The following albums are only officially available as part of this set:

Early Demos

Early Demos is an EP containing three demos, produced by Barry Devlin and recorded at Keystone Studios in November 1978. These songs are the band's second recorded studio work. "Street Mission" and "The Fool" have not been on any other album. "Shadows and Tall Trees" was the final track on their first studio album Boy, released in 1980.

Live from Boston 1981

Some of the tracks on this album have been originally released on other singles previous to the release of this album.

Live from the Point Depot

Live from the Point Depot is the first official release of the band's widely bootlegged New Year's Eve show at Dublin's Point Depot in 1989.

Unreleased & Rare

Unreleased & Rare is a compilation of unreleased and rare tracks. Most of the previously unreleased songs were from the band's All That You Can't Leave Behind and How to Dismantle an Atomic Bomb sessions. The album Medium, Rare & Remastered, released in 2009, contains similar tracks.

See also
U2 discography
List of U2 songs

References

External links
Complete track listing of all 446 songs, with a discussion of excluded and redundant tracks

Albums produced by Brian Eno
Albums produced by Chris Thomas (record producer)
Albums produced by Daniel Lanois
Albums produced by Jacknife Lee
Albums produced by Jimmy Iovine
Albums produced by Martin Hannett
Albums produced by Steve Lillywhite
ITunes-exclusive releases
U2 compilation albums
U2 live albums
U2 EPs
2004 live albums
2004 compilation albums
Albums produced by Bono
Albums produced by the Edge